Maria Robsahm (before June 2008 Maria Carlshamre; born Maria Kelldén on 3 February 1957 in Enköping) is a Swedish politician who was a Member of the European Parliament from 2004 to 2009. She was elected as a member of the Liberal People's Party, part of the Alliance of Liberals and Democrats for Europe. However, she defected to Feminist Initiative on 1 March 2006.

She sat on the European Parliament's Committee on Civil Liberties, Justice and Home Affairs and the Committee on Women's Rights and Gender Equality. She was also a substitute for the Committee on Culture and Education and a member of the Delegation to the EU-Moldova Parliamentary Cooperation Committee.

Robsahm was convicted of accounting irregularities in August 2005, following the bankruptcy of a company owned jointly by herself (then known as Maria Carlshamre) and her former husband. She was given a suspended sentence. As a result of her conviction, the leadership of the Liberal People's Party called on her to resign from her seat in the European Parliament. Instead, she left that party and joined Feminist Initiative. This move received some Swedish media attention for the fact that one of the two co-leaders of Feminist Initiative, Gudrun Schyman, had been convicted on another finance-related crime, tax evasion.

Education
 1979: Bachelor's degree in philosophy
 1988–90: University diploma in journalism

Career
 1979–88: lecturer in philosophy at University of Gothenburg
 1992–95: Editor at TV4
 1996: Grand prize for journalism
 1996–97: Journal Moderna tider
 1998–2002: Documentary film producer at TV4
 2002–03: Political editor at Dagens Nyheter

See also
 2004 European Parliament election in Sweden

Notes

External links
 
 

1957 births
Living people
Swedish feminists
Academic staff of the University of Gothenburg
Liberals (Sweden) MEPs
Feminist Initiative (Sweden) MEPs
MEPs for Sweden 2004–2009
21st-century women MEPs for Sweden
Swedish politicians convicted of crimes